Chris Marrs Piliero is an American actor, writer, producer, and director of short films and music videos.

Piliero directed the 2010 music video for Tighten Up by The Black Keys, which won the 2010 MTV Video Music Award for Breakthrough Video.

Piliero subsequently directed the music video for Howlin' for You by The Black Keys—a parody in the form of an action movie trailer.  Released in February 2011, it includes Dan Auerbach and Patrick Carney (The Black Keys) in a minor role of two henchmen referred to as "Las Teclas de Negro". The video was nominated for the 2011 MTV Video Music Award for Best Rock Video.  An interview with Piliero during the filming of this video was released in March 2011 with some commentary about the filming, and short clips of the cast describing their characters.

Piliero also wrote and directed many other music videos, including the 2010 video If You Let Me by Chrissie Hynde's band JP, Chrissie and the Fairground Boys and the 2011 videos I Wanna Go and Criminal by Britney Spears.

Partial list of music videos

Footnotes:
1 There are two versions of "Tighten Up". Piliero's is the later, "official" video.

References

External links
 
 Chris Marrs Piliero at IMVDb

American film directors
American music video directors
Living people
Place of birth missing (living people)
Year of birth missing (living people)